Susanne Müller is a retired German swimmer who won bronze medals in the 4 × 100 m medley relay at the 1991 World Aquatics Championships and in the 50 m butterfly event at the European Sprint Swimming Championships 1992.

References

Living people
German female swimmers
German female butterfly swimmers
World Aquatics Championships medalists in swimming
Year of birth missing (living people)